Wayne Malcolm Garratt (30 October 1968 in Halesowen, England – 28 September 1992) was a speedway rider in the United Kingdom, who started his speedway career with the Cradley Heathens in the British League on his 16th birthday. Garratt was also a junior grasstrack champion at the age of six. He was well known as ‘Bodger'.

Career summary
Garratt showed a lot of promise, but due to the points limit restrictions he was loaned to the Arena Essex Hammers in the National League for two seasons. He was recalled to Cradley again in 1991 but was forced out again by the points limit for 1992. However, in 1992, whilst on loan with the Newcastle Diamonds he was involved in a crash at Brough Park on Sunday 13 September and was rushed to hospital and placed on a life support machine. Garratt died after 15 days and never having regained consciousness. His body was transported back to the West Midlands.

See also
Rider deaths in motorcycle racing

References

1968 births
1992 deaths
British speedway riders
English motorcycle racers
Cradley Heathens riders
Newcastle Diamonds riders
Lakeside Hammers riders
Motorcycle racers who died while racing
Sport deaths in England
People from Halesowen